Colchagua (Mapudungun for "cornfield") may refer to:

Geography and hydrography
Places in Chile:
 Colchagua Province, province in O'Higgins Region
 Colchagua (historical province), a province (region) of Chile between 1826 and 1976
 Colchagua Valley, a valley which comprises the territories of Colchagua Province and Cardenal Caro Province, both in O'Higgins Region
 Colchagua Valley (wine region) in O'Higgins Region
 Colchagua, O'Higgins, a village located near San Fernando, O'Higgins Region
 Colchagua, Quillón, Bío Bío, a village located in the commune of Quillón, Bío Bío Region
 Colchagua, San Rosendo, Bío Bío, a village located in the commune of San Rosendo, Bío Bío Region
 Colchagua Estuary, which flows into the Bío Bío River

Institutions
 Colegio Valle de Colchagua, a school in San Fernando, Chile
 Colchagua Club de Deportes, a football club based in San Fernando